Léon Auguste Adolphe Belly  (1827–1877) was  a French landscape painter.

Life
Belly was born at St. Omer, in 1827. He studied under Troyon, and in 1849 visited Barbizon where he came under the influence of Théodore Rousseau.

In 1850–1 he travelled to Greece, Syria, and Egypt. In 1855–6 he visited Egypt, travelling up the Nile in the company of another painter, Edouard Imer. A second trip to Egypt in 1856 was largely spent making studies for his painting Pilgrims going to Mecca, now in the Musée d'Orsay.

As well as his paintings of Middle Eastern subjects  he painted portraits and landscapes of Normandy and the Sologne throughout his career, and in 1867 bought land at Montboulan. He died in Paris in 1877.

Works
His paintings include:

Twilight in November.
Fishers of équilles.
The Desert of Nassoub. 1857.
The Plain of Djyseh.
Pilgrims going to Mecca, ("Pèlerins allant à la Mecque") 1861. Paris, Musée d'Orsay.
The Banks of the Nile ("Bords du Nil (Vieux Caire), Barques"}. Saint-Omer, Musée de l'hôtel Sandelin.
Approach to an Egyptian Village.
The Dead Sea ("La Mer morte") 1866. Paris, Musée du quai Branly.
The Nile — near Rosetta.
Montboulan in Sologne ("le gué de Montboulan, en Sologne"), 1877. Paris, musée d'Orsay.

Gallery

References

Sources

Further reading

 Pouillon, F., Dictionnaire des Orientalistes de Langue Française, KARTHALA, 2008, p. 75

French male painters
Landscape artists
French orientalists
Orientalist painters
People from Saint-Omer
1827 births
1877 deaths
19th-century French painters
19th-century French male artists